The College of Business at Clayton State University is an AACSB Accredited business school in Metro Atlanta, Georgia.  It is the largest AACSB accredited business school in south suburban Atlanta. Faculty conduct and publish research which is then used in conjunction with case studies and various other aids to improve student learning.

Jim Wood Speakers Series
The Speaker Series provides a forum for many of Georgia's business personalities to engage discussion with students.   Recent speakers include:

Elba Pareja-Gallagher, Founder ShowMe50.org, eCommerce Strategy at UPS 
Milton Jones, Market President of Bank of America 
C.D. Moody, CEO of Moody Construction
Frank A. Argenbright, Chairman of Air Serv Corporation
Harsha Agadi, CEO of Churches Chicken
Joe Ruggles, President of Eleven Realty
Glenn Farris, CEO of Biomass Gas and Electric
Christine Jacobs, CEO of Theragenics
Dan Cathy, COO of Chick Fil A
James Young, CEO of Citizen's Trust Bank
Julia Wallace, Editor of Atlanta Journal-Constitution
Crystal Edmonson, Broadcast Editor of Atlanta Business Chronicle
Robin Loudermilk, President and CEO of Aaron Rents, Inc.

College of Business programs

Undergraduate Majors
B.B.A. in Accounting
B.B.A. in General Business
B.B.A. in Marketing
B.B.A. in Management
B.B.A. in Supply Chain Management

Undergraduate Minors
 Business
 Entrepreneurship & Innovation
 Finance
 Marketing
 Supply Chain Management

Graduate programs
 MBA (Offered in Clayton County, Georgia)
 MBA for Working Professionals (Offered in Peachtree City, Georgia)

Centers and institutes
Small Business Development Center (SBDC)
Center for Supply Chain Management (SCMC)
Center for Research on Economic Sustainability and Trends (CREST)
Center for Entrepreneurship and Innovation (CEI)
Center for Business and International Negotiation (CBIN)

Student organizations
Accounting Club
Beta Alpha Psi
Beta Gamma Sigma
Finance Club
Marketing Club
Society for Advancement of Management
Society for Human Resource Management
Volunteer Income Tax Assistance (VITA)

External links
Official site
Clayton State University site

References

Clayton State University